This is a list of members of the Bougainville House of Representatives from 2015 to 2020 as elected at the 2015 election.

References

Bougainville House of Representatives